Colin McAdam may refer to:

Colin McAdam (novelist), Canadian novelist
Colin McAdam (footballer) (1951–2013), former Scottish football player who played for Rangers F.C.